Frederick Murray Ashford (28 September 1886 – 29 September 1965) was an English athlete from Islington, London. He competed in the 1908 Summer Olympics in London.

Ashford represented Great Britain in the 800 metres at the 1908 Summer Olympics, but did not finish his semifinal heat, so did not advance to the final.

Previous to the Olympics, Ashford had been a finalist in the 880 yards, representing the Finchley Harriers at the 1908 AAA Championships.   He later studied piano and organ at the Royal Academy of Music, developing into a tenor.  He used his singing skills to form a Concert Party which played the season at Scarborough every year from 1929-39.

References

Sources
 
 
 

1886 births
1965 deaths
People from Islington (district)
English male middle-distance runners
Olympic athletes of Great Britain
Athletes (track and field) at the 1908 Summer Olympics
English tenors
20th-century British male singers